Pseudochromis lugubris, also known as the Mournful dottyback, is a species of ray-finned fish from the Western Pacific around Papua New Guinea, which is a member of the family Pseudochromidae.

References

lugubris
Taxa named by Anthony C. Gill
Taxa named by Gerald R. Allen
Fish described in 2004